Butterfingers are an Australian hip hop group from Brisbane, Queensland. Most of their releases are on their own label, Valley Trash Records. They are currently signed to New World Artists.

History
The group was formed when lead vocalist 'Evil' Eddie Mark Jacobson booked himself in for a gig at The Zoo, a bar in Brisbane, without a band or any intentions of performing solo. The venue held Jacobson's booking to him, and a backing band was assembled featuring DJ/percussionist Olly Thomas, bassist Dave Crane, and drummer Damien Green.

Their first two singles "Everytime" and "I Love Work", reached No. 38 and No. 15 respectively in the Triple J Hottest 100 of 2003.

Their next single "Yo Mama" also receiving airplay on Triple J with the group's debut album, Breakfast at Fatboys, on its national release, 3 May 2004, awarded Triple J 'Album of the Week'.  The album debuted at No. 15 on the ARIA Album charts and was also nominated for the 'Best Independent Release' at the 2004 ARIA Music Awards "Yo Mama" charted at No. 17 in the Triple J Hottest 100 of 2004. In October 2004 Butterfingers scored a Guest Programming spot on rage.

In March 2005 Butterfingers aligned themselves with Festival Mushroom Records through a licensing deal between FMR and Valley Trash, the bands in-house label.  Their first (and last) co-release was in June 2005 with the release of the single, "Figjam (Fuck I'm Good, Just Ask Me)". The song peaked at No. 50 and in October 2005, "Figjam" was nominated for 'Best Urban Release' at the 2005 ARIA Music Awards. "Figjam" and the preceding single, "Jesus I Was Evil" (a Darcy Clay cover) charted at No. 11 and No. 69 respectively in the Triple J Hottest 100 of 2005.

The band released a new album, The Deeper You Dig... on 27 May 2006, which peaked at No. 14 on the album chart. A single from the album, "Get Up Outta the Dirt", was released on 3 June 2006. The single peaked at No. 36, and charted at No. 83 in the Triple J Hottest 100 of 2006.

In June 2007 the band won an APRA award - 'Most Performed Urban Work' for "Get Up Outta the Dirt". The group then released "Nothin Much Happens" as a single in October 2007, which landed on Triple J's "hit list" of songs receiving medium to high rotation. A music video was produced for this song and was played on jtv, and on rage, and also Video Hits.

With the band on a presumed hiatus, lead vocalist Eddie Jacobson began performing with Brisbane-based punk band, SpitFireLiar. Jacobson also went on to a solo single under the name Evil Eddie, entitled "Queensland".

Jacobson's debut solo album, Welcome to Flavour Country, was released in November 2012.

Butterfingers announced their reformation, alongside releasing a new single "Big Night Out," in March 2017.

They then went on tour to celebrate the 15-year anniversary of Breakfast at Fatboys in 2019, supported by Fresh Violet.

The band released a new album, Bad News, in April 2020.

Members
Current members
 "Evil Eddie" Jacobson − lead vocals, guitar, samples (2001–2009, 2017–present)
 Olly Thomas − keyboards, percussion, samples, turntables, backing vocals (2001–2009, 2017–present)
 Tony McCall − drums, backing vocals (2017–present)

Former members
 Dave Crane – bass guitar (2001–2009)
 Damien Green − drums (2001–2009)
 Brad "Bradzilla" Cochrane − bass guitar (2017–2021)

Discography

Albums

Singles

Awards and nominations

ARIA Awards
The ARIA Music Awards are presented annually since 1987 by the Australian Recording Industry Association (ARIA).

|-
| 2004 || Breakfast at Fatboys || Best Independent Release || 
|-
| 2005 || "Figjam" || Best Urban Release ||

APRA Awards
The APRA Awards are presented annually from 1982 by the Australasian Performing Right Association (APRA).

|-
| 2007 || "Get Up Outta the Dirt" – Eddie Jacobson || Most Performed Urban Work ||

References

External links
 Official site

APRA Award winners
Australian hip hop groups
Rapcore groups
Musical groups from Brisbane